Daniël Robberechts (8 May 1937 in Etterbeek – 27 May 1992 in Everbeek) was a Belgian writer.

Bibliography
 De labiele stilte (1968)
 Tegen het personage (1968)
 De grote schaamlippen (1969)
 Aankomen in Avignon (1970); Arriving in Avignon, translated by Paul Vincent, Dalkey Archive Press, 2010.
 Materialen voor een eigentijdse praktijk van het schrijven, in Schrift, 12-28 (1972–1977)
 Praag schrijven (1975)
 Verwoordingen, in Het mes in het beeld (1976)
 Onderwerpen. Subjecten. Brokken. Verwoordingen (1978)
 Bezwarende geschriften 1967-1977 (1984)
 Dagboek '64-'65 (1984)
 Dagboek '66-'68 (1987)
 Nagelaten werk (1994)

Awards
 1964 - Arkprijs van het Vrije Woord

See also
 Flemish literature

Sources
 Daniel Robberechts
 G.J. van Bork en P.J. Verkruijsse, De Nederlandse en Vlaamse auteurs (1985)
 Fernand Auwera, ‘Daniël Robberechts’ In: Schrijven of schieten. Interviews (1969)

1937 births
1992 deaths
Flemish writers
Ark Prize of the Free Word winners